Bogra,  officially known as Bogura, is a major city located in Bogra District, Rajshahi Division, Bangladesh. The city is a major commercial hub in Northern Bangladesh. It is the second largest city in Rajshahi Division with a population of over 3.7 million. The Bogra bridge connects the Rajshahi Division and Rangpur Division.

Bogra is named after Nasiruddin Bughra Khan, the Governor of Bengal from 1279 to 1282 and the son of Delhi Sultan Ghiyasuddin Balban. Bogra has a population of around 12,40,000 people. Since it is one of the oldest cities in Bengal, Bogra is famous for its many ancient Buddhist stupas, Hindu temples, and ancient palaces of Buddhist kings and Muslim sultans.

The city has produced notable personalities including Prime Minister Muhammad Ali Bogra of Pakistan, President Ziaur Rahman of Bangladesh, both of whom were born and lived in the city.

History

Bogra is considered the oldest city of Bengal, dating to the reign of the Great Emperor Ashoka, who ruled India from 268 to 232 BCE. When Ashoka conquered the Bengal (Bongo) region, he founded Bogra and called it Pundra Bardhan. This is supported by the discovery in October 2008 of an ancient engraved stone believed to be produced in the Gupta era near Sura Masjid at Ghoraghat Upazila in Dinajpur.

Bogra has been a transportation, cultural and economic hub for thousands of years. In the early 800AD, it was a core place of doing business through the Karatoya River(A sub-river of Bangali River, not to be confused with the Large Karatoya River). By 1200 AD it had also become an important geopolitical center for spreading Islam through the Mahasthangarh. In the late fiftieth century, it became a statistical trade area by the British East India Company.

In the late seventh century, the British East India Company gave control of the area to Nowab & Shatani families, who still are two of the most reputed family in the city.

During the Bangladesh War of Independence, the area witnessed the Battle of Bogra, a fierce conflict between the guerrilla units of the Bangladesh Forces under Sector 7 and the Pakistan Army.

Geography

The principal rivers in the district are formed by the different channels of the Brahmaputra. The rivers have local names such as the Konai, the Daokoba, and the Jamuna. The latter forms a portion of the eastern boundary of the district. The Brahmaputra and its channels, together with three minor streams, the Bangali, Karatoya, and Atrai, drive the thriving commercial activities in the area.

In 1911 the Karatoya (which flows from north to south), divided the district into two portions, the eastern tract with rich alluvial soil, subject to fertilizing inundations, yielded heavy crops of coarse rice, oil seeds, and jute, while the soil of the higher western portion of the district allowed for growing rice.

Climate
The city enjoys a tropical climate, with two main seasons: winter and summer. Bogra experiences more rainfall during the summer.

Economy
Since the 2009 adoption of new urban planning, there has been a significant development in the infrastructure of Bogra. This includes the restructuring and widening of roads, improvement of telecommunications infrastructure, and the installation of underground gas connections.

Additionally, red chili production in Bogra is a major industry, with companies such as Square, Acme, and BD Food collecting red chili from twelve centers within Bogra.

Often called the "Town of Banks", Bogra is the location of numerous online banking facilities, credit card, debit card, and remittance companies. Banking in Bogra has significantly expanded with the presence of government banks such as the Bangladesh Bank (Central Bank), Sonali Bank, Rupali Bank, Janata Bank, Rajshahi Krishi Unnayan Bank, Bangladesh Development Bank Ltd., Uttara Bank Ltd, and Agrani Bank, as well as a number of private and specialized banks, including Pubali Bank, National Bank, IFIC bank Ltd., Citi Bank Ltd., and others.

Bogra is also home to an increasing number of IT, software, technology, and computer services companies. One of the milestones of its tech sector occurred in 2008 when the French Grameen Group and Groupe Danone entered into a joint venture with a local company to establish an organization named Grameen Danone.

Statistically, Bogra's workforce is still dominated by jobs in the agriculture sector (29.95%) and agricultural manufacturing (12.53%). They are followed by general commerce (18.11%), customer service (15.62%), transportation (6.66%), wage labor (2.2%), and other industries (14.93%).

Transportation

Bogra is also known as the gateway of North Bengal due to its communication capabilities. Bogra has several railway stations and bus terminals (Charmatha Bus Terminal, Thantahnia Bus Terminal, BRTC Bus Terminal, and Haddipotti Bus Terminal). It has one of the best inter-district communication. Usually, people come from 20 to 45  km to the city to do their day job. Only a handful of cities in Bangladesh have this type of communication infrastructure. People use both Train & Bus communication to visit the city every day. Bus & CNG is the most crucial communication method for most citizens.

Almost every school has bus services (except Bogra Zilla School & Bogra Victoria Manorial School), which helps the city to have fewer traffic jams than most other cities in rush hours. It has also the 2nd highest number of Rickshaws in the country. It also has the highest number of private cars in North Bengal (Approximately 65% of the whole North-Bengal region).

Bogra has always been the key transportation hub for Bangladesh & North Bengal. Before the '80s & 90's all Trucks & Buses in North Bengal needed to pass through Bogra to go to their desired destination. Thus Bogra has one of the biggest Motor-labor unions in the country.

Tourism
Near Bogra is Mahasthangarh, the earliest known urban archaeological site in Bangladesh, as well as the village of Mahasthan in Shibganj thana of Bogra District. This site contains the remains of Pundranagara (or Paundravardhanapura), an ancient city in the territory of Pundravardhana. This place is considered sacred to Buddhists, Muslims, and Hindus alike. Pilgrims and visitors tour the area all year round.

The Behular Bashor Ghor is a popular tourist attraction in the city and is close to other popular spots and monuments such as the Mahasthangar, Nawab Palace (called Neelkuthi during the British period), Kherua Mosque (Sherpur Upazila), Bara Mosque, Mazar of Shah Sultan Balkhi, Mazar of Panchpir, Gokul Medh, Palace of Parshuram, Basu Bihara, Palli Unnayan Academy, Saudia City Park, Bhimer Jangle, Museum of Nawab Bari Palace, Wonderland Shishupark (a children's park), Shanewaz Shishubagan, Woodburn Park, Dreshtinandan Park, Bijayangan (the War of Liberation museum), and the Jaina Temple.

Notable residents

 Ziaur Rahman, President of Bangladesh (1977-1981), attended Bogra Zilla School
 Humayun Ahmed, writer and filmmaker, attended Bogra Zilla School.
 Khademul Bashar, Bir Uttam, chief of the Bangladesh Air Force in 1976, was born in Bogra.
 Apu Biswas, film actress
 Muhammad Ali Bogra, Prime Minister of Pakistan (1953–1955), lived in Bogra.
 Akhteruzzaman Elias, novelist and short story writer, attended Bogra Zilla School.
 Gaziul Haque, Bengali language movement activist, attended Bogra Zilla School.
 Muhammed Zafar Iqbal, physicist, attended Bogra Zilla School.
 Shafiul Islam, cricketer on the Bangladesh cricket team
 Tarun Majumdar, Indian film director
 Mushfiqur Rahim, cricketer of the Bangladesh cricket team
 Md Imam Hassan, Chairman of Aadhar Vorer Surjo Kona (AVSK) Society.

See also
Bogra Sadar Upazila, a sub-district (upzalia) of Bogra District.

Notes

References

External links

Official website of Bogra

Populated places in Bogra District